The Yellow rose aphid (Rhodobium porosum) is an aphid in the superfamily Aphidoidea in the order Hemiptera. It is a true bug that is found on strawberrys and roses.

References

External links
 Aphid.aphidnet.org
 
 Researchgate.net
 Journals.cambridge.org
 Aphid.speciesfile.org

Macrosiphini
Agricultural pest insects
Insects described in 1900